Fesler is a surname. Notable people with the surname include:

James W. Fesler (1911–2005), American political scientist
Peter Fesler, American Air Force general
Wes Fesler (1908–1989), American football, basketball, and baseball player and coach of football and basketball

See also
Felser